Delegan or Dalgan may refer to:
 Delegan-e Madrasah
 Delegan-e Mazan Far
 Delegan-e Molla Faqir
 Delegan-e Sheykh Cheragh
 Dalgan County